Euthymius the Great (377 – 20 January 473) was an abbot in Palestine. He is venerated in both Roman Catholic and Eastern Orthodox Churches.

Euthymius' vita was written by Cyril of Skythopolis, who describes him as the founder of several monasteries in the Judaean desert, while remaining a solitary monk in the tradition of Egyptian monasticism. He nevertheless played a decisive role in helping the decisions of the Council of Chalcedon (451) prevail in Jerusalem, in spite of the majority of the monks in the region opposing it.

Life

Euthymius was born in Melitene in Lesser Armenia, in a pious family of noble birth. According to Christian tradition, his parents, Paul and Dionysia, had prayed for a son at the church of Saint Polyeuctus in Melitene. When the child was born, they named him Euthymius, meaning "good cheer".

Euthymius was educated by Bishop Otreius of Melitene, who afterwards ordained him and placed him in charge of all the monasteries in the Diocese of Melitene. In 405/406, at about thirty years of age he secretly set out on a pilgrimage to Jerusalem and remained for some time in a cave near a settlement of monks at a laura called Pharan, about six miles east of Jerusalem, at Ein Fara in Wadi Kelt.

In 411, Euthymius withdrew into the wilderness with a fellow-hermit, -Theoctistus (see below), living in a rough cavern on the banks of a torrent. When many disciples gathered around them, they turned the cavern into a church and built a monastery which was placed in the charge of Theoctistus. Euthymius, despite retaining his solitary lifestyle, gave direction for the others. Next, he is credited with establishing the monastery of Caparbaricha in 422.

Cyril of Skythopolis is describing how a miraculous cure effected by Euthymius for Terebon, the son of the Saracen chief called "Aspebetus" by Cyril (in fact probably the Persian title of the man, "spahbed"), led the latter and his entire tribe into adopting Christianity, with Aspebetus being baptised as Peter. Maris, Terebon's uncle, financed the construction of a monastery, the tribe settles around it in an encampment, "parembole" in Greek, and Euthymius intervened with the patriarch of Jerusalem, Juvenal, to ordain Peter. Euthymius is credited to be the founder of the monastery, known as the monastery of the Paremboles. Apparently Aspebetus/Peter did indeed become a priest around 427, while also remaining a phylarch, i.e. a tribal chief allied to the Empire. He even received the rank of a bishop with the title "Bishop of Parembolæ", i.e. "of the Camps", given the nomadic nature of his flock, in which capacity he went on to attend the Council of Ephesus in 431.

When the report of the miracle Euthymius had performed on Terebon, the name of Euthymius became famous throughout Palestine, and large crowds came to visit him in his solitude, he retreated with his disciple Domitian to the wilderness of Ruba, near the Dead Sea, living for some time on a remote mountain called Marda by the Byzantines - no other than the ancient Masada of Roman-era fame. When large crowds followed him to this place also, he decided to return to the neighbourhood of the monastery of Theoctistus, where he took up his abode in a cavern. Every Sunday he came to the monastery to take part in the divine services. At length, because numerous disciples desired him as their spiritual guide, he founded in 420, on the right side of the road from Jerusalem to Jericho, a laura similar to that of Pharan, the Laura of Euthymius, later known as Khan al-Ahmar. The church connected with this laura was dedicated in 428 by Juvenal, the first patriarch of Jerusalem. Euthymius settled there for the rest of his life.

When the Fourth Œcumenical Synod (451) condemned the errors of Eutyches and Dioscorus, it was greatly due to the authority of Euthymius that most of the Eastern recluses accepted its decrees. The Empress Eudoxia was converted to Orthodoxy through his efforts.

The Church celebrates his feast on 20 January (for those Orthodox Christians who still go by the Julian calendar this date occurs on 2 February on the Gregorian Calendar), the day of his death.

Theoctistus

Theoctistus (also spelled Theoktistos) of Palestine, was an associate of Euthymius. He was an ascetic who lived in a nearby cell at the Pharan lavra. About five years after Euthymius arrived, they went into the desert for Great Lent, and found in a wadi a large cave where they remained praying in solitude for some time. Eventually shepherds from Bethany discovered them, and people from the area began to visit seeking spiritual guidance and bringing food. The monks then built a church. When other monks came seeking instruction, Euthymius and Theoctistus built a lavra over the cave church. Theoctistus became hegumen of the monastery.

Theoctistus died at an advanced age in 451 and is commemorated on 3 September.

See also
Anthony the Great (c. 251 – 356), monk who established Christian monasticism in the Egyptian desert
Chariton the Confessor (end of 3rd century - ca. 350), founder of lavra-type monasticism in the Judaean desert
Euthymiac History, a fragmentary history, possibly a life of Euthymius the Great
Monastery of Martyrius

References

External links
St Euthymius the Great Orthodox Icon and Synaxarion (January 20)

377 births
473 deaths
Cappadocian Greeks
Saints from the Holy Land
Palestinian hermits
5th-century Christian saints
People from Malatya